The 1958 Chicago White Sox season was the team's 58th season in the major leagues, and its 59th season overall. They finished with a record of 82–72, good enough for second place in the American League, 10 games behind the first-place New York Yankees.

Offseason 
 December 4, 1957: Minnie Miñoso and Fred Hatfield were traded by the White Sox to the Cleveland Indians for Early Wynn and Al Smith.

Regular season

Season standings

Record vs. opponents

Opening Day lineup 
 Luis Aparicio, SS
 Nellie Fox, 2B
 Billy Goodman, 3B
 Sherm Lollar, C
 Tito Francona, RF
 Earl Torgeson, 1B
 Al Smith, LF
 Bubba Phillips, CF
 Billy Pierce, P

Notable transactions 
 June 15, 1958: Bill Fischer and Tito Francona were traded by the White Sox to the Detroit Tigers for Ray Boone and Bob Shaw.
 June 24, 1958: Walt Dropo was selected off waivers from the White Sox by the Cincinnati Redlegs.

Roster

Player stats

Batting 
Note: G = Games played; AB = At bats; R = Runs scored; H = Hits; 2B = Doubles; 3B = Triples; HR = Home runs; RBI = Runs batted in; BB = Base on balls; SO = Strikeouts; AVG = Batting average; SB = Stolen bases

Pitching 
Note: W = Wins; L = Losses; ERA = Earned run average; G = Games pitched; GS = Games started; SV = Saves; IP = Innings pitched; H = Hits allowed; R = Runs allowed; ER = Earned runs allowed; HR = Home runs allowed; BB = Walks allowed; K = Strikeouts

Awards 

 Luis Aparicio, Gold Glove Award
 Sherm Lollar, Gold Glove Award

Farm system 

LEAGUE CHAMPIONS: Colorado Springs

Notes

References 
 1958 Chicago White Sox at Baseball Reference

Chicago White Sox seasons
Chicago White Sox season
Chicago White